José Juan Almeyra is a populated place in Navarro Partido, Buenos Aires Province, Argentina.

Populated places in Buenos Aires Province